Sanden or Hadselsand is a village in Hadsel Municipality in Nordland county, Norway. Sand Church is located in Sanden.

References

Hadsel
Villages in Nordland